The 2018 FINA Diving World Cup took place in Wuhan, China, from 4 to 10 June 2018. It was the 21st edition of the Diving World Cup, and the seventh time that it had been held in China. The venue was the natatorium of Wuhan Sports Center.

Schedule 
All times are local, CST (UTC+8).

Medal summary 
As reported by FINA.

Men's events

Women's events

Mixed events

Medal table 
As reported by FINA.

See also

2018 FINA Diving World Series

References

External links
 FINA website 
 Indiana City-County Observer
 Texas Sports

FINA Diving World Cup
FINA Diving World Cup
FINA Diving World Cup
Sport in Wuhan
Diving competitions in China
International aquatics competitions hosted by China
FINA Diving World Cup